Pascal Damien Balisson (born 28 October 1996) is a Mauritian international footballer who plays for Cercle de Joachim as a left back.

Club career
Born in Port Louis, he has played club football for Cercle de Joachim, La Tamponnaise and Thonon Évian. In the summer 2019, Damien joined French club Thonon Évian. He returned to Cercle de Joachim later that season.

International career
He made his international debut for Mauritius in 2015.

International goals
Scores and results list Mauritius' goal tally first.

References

1996 births
Living people
Mauritian footballers
Mauritius international footballers
Cercle de Joachim SC players
La Tamponnaise players
Thonon Evian Grand Genève F.C. players
Association football fullbacks
Mauritian expatriate footballers
Mauritian expatriates in Réunion
Expatriate footballers in Réunion
Mauritian expatriates in France
Expatriate footballers in France